Daniel Orsanic and Mariano Puerta were the defending champions, but Puerta did not participate this year.  Orsanic partnered with Jaime Oncins, losing in the quarterfinals.

David Adams and John-Laffnie de Jager won the title, defeating Max Mirnyi and Nenad Zimonjić 6–4, 6–4 in the final.

Seeds

Draw

Draw

External links
Draw

2000 ATP Tour
Doubles